A topor is a type of conical headgear traditionally worn by grooms as part of the Bengali Hindu wedding ceremony. The topor is typically fragile, made of sholapith and white in colour.

The topor is traditionally given to the groom by the bride's family. The groom dons the topor before the main ceremony begins. It is believed to bring good luck. Brides will typically wear related, but differently-shaped, headgear.

Topors are also worn by infant boys as part of the annaprashana ceremony, when they are dressed like grooms.

Religious significance
According to a legend associated with it, it is evident that the Topor was crafted because Lord Shiva wanted to wear a special headwear for the wedding ceremony and he gave this task to Vishvakarma but he failed to design a beautiful and eye-catching headgear as he was only specialized in handling hard materials. Later, the Lord Shiva assigned a Malakar to make a headgear using sholapith. From then, the Topor became a significant part of traditional Bengali Hindu weddings.

References 

Indian headgear
Bengal
Indian wedding clothing
Pointed hats